Roberta Lombardi (born 15 August 1973) is an Italian politician.

Biography
Roberta Lombardi was born in Orbetello in 1973, to parents from Boville Ernica in southern Lazio where she grew up. She graduated in law from La Sapienza University of Rome with a thesis in international commercial law and followed a course in managerial development at LUISS University. Since 2004 she has worked at an interior design company.

In 2008, she ran in the municipal elections of Rome with the civic list "Friends of Beppe Grillo" and obtained 191 preference votes, without being elected. She then joined the Five Star Movement since its foundation. In 2013 she was elected to the Chamber of Deputies in the Lazio 1 constituency. 

From 19 March to 24 July 2013 she was chairman of the M5S Group in the Chamber (but by virtue of the group's internal regulations, which provided for the quarterly rotation of the office, she ceded  unofficially the function of chairman of the group to Riccardo Nuti already on 5 June 2013).

She was a candidate for President in the 2018 Lazio regional election, getting 27.0% of preferences and finishing third, behind Stefano Parisi and Nicola Zingaretti. Since 4 March 2018 she is councilor of the Lazio Region and leader of the M5S group in the Regional Council of Lazio.

References

1973 births
Politicians of Piedmont
Five Star Movement politicians
Deputies of Legislature XVII of Italy
Living people
Sapienza University of Rome alumni
People from Orbetello